Wildpark-Höfli is a railway station in the Sihl Valley, and the municipality of Langnau am Albis, in the Swiss Canton of Zurich. The station is on the Sihltal line, which is operated by the Sihltal Zürich Uetliberg Bahn (SZU). It takes its name from the nearby settlement of Höfli, and the Wildpark Langenberg, a nearby zoo. Opened in 1982, it replaced the nearby station "Gontenbach".

The station is served by the following passenger trains:

References 

Railway stations in the canton of Zürich
Langnau am Albis